Aleksandr Ilyin may refer to:
 Alexander Ilyin (mathematician) (born 1973), Russian mathematician
 Aleksandr Aleksandrovich Ilyin (born 1983), Russian actor
 Aleksandr Ilyin (footballer) (born 1993), Russian footballer
 Alexander Ilyin-Genevsky (1894–1941), Soviet chess player